California Clam Chowder is an album by Thelonious Monster. It was released in 2004, the band's first release since 1992. It is a collection of interpretations of some of the world's most influential, iconoclastic artists.

Critical reception
The Los Angeles Times wrote that "Bob Forrest and company bring their customary passion and rambunctious camaraderie to their tales of hanging in against the odds."

Track listing 
 The Gun Club Song
 The Bob Dylan Song
 The Joy Division Song
 The Germs Song
 The Curtis Mayfield Song
 The Jam Song
 The Rolling Stones '77 Song
 The Ramones Song
 The Bowie Low Song
 The Big Star Song
 The Iggy Stooge Song
 The Beck Song
 The Elton John Song
 The Thelonious Monster Song
 The Oasis Song

Personnel 
 Bob Forrest — vocals
 Dix Denney — guitar plus other strings
 Dallas Don Burnet — bass guitar, guitar, Moog, piano, vocals
 Pete Weiss — drums, percussion, guitar
 Jon Sidel — guitar

Additional musicians:
 Josh Klinghoffer — guitar, marimba
 Greg Kurstin — keyboards

References

External links 
 harpmagazine.com review

2004 albums
Lakeshore Records albums